Wachira (also "Wacira" or "Wachiira") is a male name among the Kikuyu, also called Gikuyu, and related Bantu peoples of Kenya. Derived from "Chira" or Case. "Wa" signifies that one who deals with cases. Some contend that the name signifies one who feels and senses much that they do not fully understand, and can be deeply influenced through the thoughts of others without realizing just how you are being affected. Notable people with the name include:

 John Wachira, winner of the 2009 Two Oceans Marathon
 Wachira Sangsri, professional footballer from Thailand